Absolutely is the debut studio album by American musician Dijon. It was released on November 5, 2021, through R&R and Warner Records.

Critical Reception 
Absolutely was listed as the "third best album of 2021" by The Fader and received a 7.3 (out of 10) score from Pitchfork.

Track listing

Personnel 
Credits adapted from AllMusic.

 Dijon Duenas (Bass, Clarinet, Composer, Drums, Guitar, Mixing, Organ, Producer, Synthesizer, Vocals)
 God's Children (vocals)
 Mike Gordon (Bass, Composer, Drums, Guitar, Mixing, Piano, Synthesizer, Vocals)
 Noah Le Gros (Composer, Guitar, Slide Guitar, Vocals)
 Jack Karaszewski (Composer, Drum Programming, Mixing, Producer, Synthesizer)
 John Keek (Clarinet, Keyboards, Saxophone)
 John Keuch (Composer)
 Henry Kwapis (Bongos, Producer)
 Simon Lancelot (Mastering)
 Gabe Noel (Bass)
 Andrew Sarlo (Composer, Mixing, Producer, Programming)
 Sam Wilkes (Bass)

References 

2021 albums